Acrobasis bithynella is a species of snout moth in the genus Acrobasis. It was described by Philipp Christoph Zeller in 1848, and is known from France, the Iberian Peninsula, Italy, Croatia, Crete, Turkey and Russia.

The wingspan is about 20 mm.

References

Moths described in 1848
Acrobasis
Moths of Europe
Moths of Asia